Kugrua Bay is a large bay located southwest of Peard Bay, by the Chukchi Sea, in Alaska's North Slope, United States. This area is mostly intact tundra, and is part of the polar desert.

References

Bays of Alaska
Bodies of water of North Slope Borough, Alaska